N. gardneri may refer to:
 Neonothopanus gardneri, a fungus species
 Notovoluta gardneri, a sea snail species

See also 
 Gardneri